Air Bud: Seventh Inning Fetch (also known as Air Bud 4) is a 2002 sports comedy film directed by Robert Vince. It is the fourth film in the Air Bud series and the final one to feature any cast members from the original film.

Plot

Josh is off to his first year of college and Buddy has stayed behind with Josh's little sister, Andrea, and the rest of the family. Jackie and Patrick have recently welcomed Josh and Andrea's half-brother Noah. Andrea, attempting to fit in with her junior high classmates, decides to join the baseball team. Along the way she discovers that Buddy also has the uncanny ability to play baseball. Just as the season is settling in, a terrible discovery is made—many local athletically talented dogs have mysteriously started disappearing with the help of the kidnappers' little helper, Rocky Raccoon. It turns out the kidnappers were researchers who were dognapping them because they thought they had a special gene that would enable them to play sports. Buddy must find them and make it to the major leagues as he goes to bat for the Anaheim Angels.

Cast
 Kevin Zegers - Josh Framm
 Caitlin Wachs - Andrea Framm
 Cynthia Stevenson - Jackie Framm Sullivan 
 Richard Karn - Dr. Patrick Sullivan
 Molly Hagan - Coach Crenshaw
 Shayn Solberg - Tom Stewart
 Hannah Marof and Emma Marof - Noah Sullivan
 Chantal Strand - Tammy
 Jay Brazeau - Professor Roger Siles
 Frank C. Turner - Carlton
 Doug Funk - Mailman Phil / Announcer
 Jim Hughson - Announcer
 Patrick Cranshaw - Sheriff Bob
 Ellen Kennedy - Wilma, Tammy's Mother
 Nick Harrison - Ump
 Jeremy Mersereau - Dog-Hating Fan (uncredited)
 Shooter as Buddy
 Jordy Cunningham - World Series Pitcher (uncredited)
 Todd Allan - World Series Catcher/Right Fielder (uncredited)

Release
The movie was released directly to DVD and VHS on February 21, 2002 by Walt Disney Home Entertainment. The movie was reissued by Disney on DVD on June 16, 2008 in a double-pack alongside Air Bud: Spikes Back.

Mill Creek Entertainment reissued the movie on January 14, 2020 on a 2-disc boxset, also containing other Air Bud movies owned by Air Bud Entertainment.

References

External links
 
 
 

2002 direct-to-video films
2002 films
2000s sports films
Direct-to-video sequel films
Disney direct-to-video films
Films about dogs
Films about animals playing sports
American baseball films
Films directed by Robert Vince
Air Bud (series)
2000s English-language films
Films shot in Vancouver
American sequel films
American direct-to-video films
DHX Media films
Films about animals
American children's films
Canadian baseball films
Canadian sequel films
Canadian children's comedy films
Canadian direct-to-video films
2000s American films
2000s Canadian films